南陽 (Namyang in Korean, Nan'yō in Japanese), or 南阳 (Simplified Chinese for Nányáng) may refer to:

China
Nanyang, Henan, prefecture-level city in the southwest of that province
Nanyang Commandery, a historical region centered in Nanyang City
Nanyang Town (disambiguation)
Nanyang Lake, one of the Nansi Lakes in southwestern Shandong

Japan
Nan'yō, Yamagata, city in Yamagata Prefecture
Nan'yō-Shiyakusho Station, railway station in Nan'yō, Yamagata
Nan'yō Yasumoto (1905–1977 安本 南陽), photographer

Korea
Namyang Dairy Products, a South Korean dairy company
Namyang Workers' District
Hwaseong, formerly named Namyang

See also
Nanyang (disambiguation), for other articles not represented by 南陽 when written with Chinese characters